Between the Covers is the second studio album by Wet Wet Wet frontman Marti Pellow. Released on 17 November 2003, it spawned the single "A Lot of Love" (UK #59), a cover of the original by Neil Young.

The album was recorded in 2003, during downtime in the studio, in which Pellow came up with the idea of recording an album of songs that he and his band regularly "mess about with" in soundcheck whilst performing live. The album was produced entirely by Chris Porter and Rick Mitra, with the exception of "Hard to Cry", which was included on this album as a dedication to Pellow's late mother.

The recording of "From Russia With Love", originally released as a B-side and then later as a bonus track on streaming services, was taken from the ITV1 special "Songs of James Bond", first broadcast in November 2002.

Track listing

References

External links

2003 albums
Marti Pellow albums
Covers albums